Gracia Indri, born Gracia Indriyani Sari Sulistyaningrum (born January 14, 1990) is an Indonesian actress, singer, model, and presenter. She is oldest sister of two siblings of Edo Sulistiarto and Nevos Setyaningrum. Her youngest sister, Gisela Cindy, is also a soap opera actress.

Career
Indri began at 10 years of age in the soap opera Panji Manusia Millennium. Indri has starred in many soap operas and often get antagonistic, unsympathetic, sadistic, sinister, malicious, and villainous roles, such as in the soap operas Bidadari 2 (Angel 2) and Bidadari 3 (Angel 3). She has also appeared in Aku Bukan Cantik (I'm Not Beautiful), which was produced by FrameRitz and aired on Trans TV in 2007.

Indri has released several covers of old songs as singles, and intends to release a mini album.

Personal life
On December 28, 2014, Indri married  Noah' keyboardist, David Kurnia Albert, at Santo Petrus Cathedral Church, Bandung, West Java. Later, they divorced on May 3, 2018. She married again with Dutch politician Jeffrey Slijpen at November 20, 2021 and have a daughter named Nova Lynn Slijpen that was born at November 23, 2022.

Filmography

Film

Television

Film Television

Discography

Single 
 "Gengsi Setengah Mati" (2013)
 "Patah Jadi Dua" (2013)
 "Tenda Biru" (2013)

TV commercial
 Yupi
 C & A
 Kacang Garuda (Garuda Peanuts)
 Mikorex
 Caladine
 California Fried Chicken

Awards and nominations

References

External links
 
 
 
Gracia Indri on GoPlay

Indonesian actresses
People from Pasuruan
1990 births
Living people